Academy at Ivy Ridge was an independent privately owned and operated for-profit disciplinary boarding school in Ogdensburg, New York.

Ownership and affiliation
The institution was owned by the business partnership of the Jason G. Finlinson Corporation and the Joseph and Alyn Mitchell Corporation. The property on which the school stood was purchased in 2001 by Robert Browning Lichfield Family Limited of Toquerville, Utah, and the school opened later that year in affiliation with the World Wide Association of Specialty Programs and Schools (WWASPS). In 2003 the New York Times reported that the school's director had previously been an administrator at Casa by the Sea.  In January 2006, Ivy Ridge announced that it had withdrawn from WWASPS in November 2005 because of the negative media attention that WWASPS was receiving. However, the Teen Help subsidiary of WWASPS still conducted marketing for the school as of March 2007.

Location
School promotional materials state that the facility boasts cross-country ski trails, nature trails, tennis courts, basketball courts, sand volleyball area, baseball, football and soccer fields, all located within a wooded setting. However, students were not permitted to look out windows as lower levels. A student could reach upper level status in as little as 8 months and earn the privilege to look outside, and occasionally be taken outside to play during a monthly upper level activity.

History
The institution began admitting students in 2001. As of spring 2005 there were 460 students enrolled.

The students started a riot on May 16, 2005, resulting in at least 4 dozen expulsions and 12 arrests. About 35 sheriff's deputies, state troopers, city police officers and U.S. Border Patrol agents assisted in ending the riot and capturing at least 30 runaways.

Allegations of abuse include poor living conditions, unauthorized medical procedures, psychological torture, sexual abuse, and physical abuse. Videos obtained from the school demonstrate violent restraint tactics used against students.

In March 2009 it was announced that Ivy Ridge would close until fall 2009 in order to restructure. There were about 60 students enrolled at that time; they were to be sent home or transferred to similar boarding schools. In April 2009, the campus was sold to a Delaware corporation, a spokesperson for the purchaser told news media that the school would not reopen.

Legal status as a school
On August 17, 2005, Ivy Ridge was ordered to pay civil penalties of $250,000 to the New York State Attorney General, stop issuing unauthorized high school diplomas, and refrain from advertising that it is an accredited school. In addition, it was required to make partial refunds to former students. On December 1, 2006, the New York State Department of Education denied Ivy Ridge's application for authorization to issue high school diplomas. The department's letter to Ivy Ridge stated that the institution had been determined to be principally a behavior modification program, not a school. Following this ruling, the school's enrollment dropped from about 500 to less than 100 students.

In connection with the incident, the Idaho-based Northwest Association of Accredited Schools, which had accredited Ivy Ridge, was criticized for accrediting a school outside of its service area and for violating its own procedures by not requiring a state license as a prerequisite to accreditation.

In April 2009 a judge refused to dismiss a lawsuit related to the diploma issue.

References

External links
Academy at Ivy Ridge (archived)

Boarding schools in New York (state)
Educational institutions established in 2001
Behavior modification
Schools in St. Lawrence County, New York
Defunct schools in New York (state)
2001 establishments in New York (state)
World Wide Association of Specialty Programs and Schools
Therapeutic boarding schools in the United States